334 is a science fiction novel by American author Thomas M. Disch, written in 1972. It is a dystopian look at everyday life in New York City around the year 2025. The dust cover design for the first edition was by Michael Hasted.

Title
Most of the novel's characters live in a huge housing project at 334 East 11th Street, in Manhattan. The title also refers to the year 334 AD, during the later years of the Roman Empire; numerous comparisons are made between the decline of Rome and the future of the United States.

Plot summary

The future in 334 has brought few technological advances except for new medical techniques and recreational drugs. There have been no dramatic disasters, but overpopulation has made housing and other resources scarce; the response is a program of compulsory birth control and eugenics. A welfare state provides for basic needs through an all-encompassing agency called MODICUM, but there is an extreme class division between welfare recipients and professionals.

The novel consists of five independent novellas (previously published separately) with a common setting but different characters, and a longer sub-novel called "334" whose many short sections trace the members of a single family forward and backward in time. The sections are as follows:

 "The Death of Socrates": A high-school student finds that, due to poor scores on his Regents Examinations and his father's health history, he has been permanently forbidden to have children; he searches for ways to get extra credit.
 "Bodies": Porters at Bellevue Hospital moonlight as body-snatchers catering to a necrophiliac brothel. Their task is complicated by the desire of some patients to be cryonically preserved for a better future.
 "Everyday Life in the Later Roman Empire": A privileged government worker, trying to decide where to send her son to school, pursues a parallel existence in a hallucinogen-assisted role-playing game set in the year 334.
 "Emancipation: A Romance of the Times to Come": A young professional man and woman face marital conflicts and parenthood, with several twists unique to the 2020s.
 "Angouleme": A group of highly educated prepubescent children decides to commit a gratuitous murder in Battery Park.
 "334": Vignettes of the Hanson family from 2021 to 2025.

Characters
 Mrs. Hanson: An elderly widow living at 334. Mother to Lottie, Shrimp, and Boz.
 Lottie Hanson: An unemployed single mother living at 334.
 Shrimp Hanson: Considered genetically desirable for her unusual intelligence, therefore has a free pass from the government to have children, although she is actually motivated by a fetish for artificial insemination.
 Boz Hanson: Unemployed, former resident of 334, managed to leave by marrying Milly.
 Milly Holt: A professional sex demonstrator for the high schools. Was Birdie's girlfriend, now married to Boz.
 Ab Holt: Manages the morgue at Bellevue Hospital. Milly's father.
 Birdie Ludd: A high-school student living as a "temp" in a stairwell of 334.
 Frances Schaap: A prostitute living at 334. Like many people in the 2020s, she has lupus.
 Alexa Miller: A MODICUM administrator, responsible for the Hansons.
 Tancred Miller: Alexa's son.
 Amparo Martinez: Lottie's daughter.
 Bill Harper, aka Little Mister Kissy Lips: Son of a television executive, classmate of Tancred and Amparo.

References to other works
The killing of a hospital patient by adjusting life-support equipment is referred to as "burking", a reference to the murderers Burke and Hare.
The children in "Angouleme" name their intended victim Alyona Ivanovna, after Raskolnikov's first victim in Crime and Punishment.
Miss Kraus, the delusional sign-carrying woman who frequents Battery Park in "Angouleme", was an actual person alive at the time Disch wrote the novel.

Critical reception
334 was selected by David Pringle as one of the 100 best science-fiction novels written since World War II.

Samuel R. Delany's The American Shore (1978) is a book-length critical essay on the novella "Angouleme"; Delany argues that despite the lack of any scientific themes in "Angouleme", its speculative setting makes it inherently science fiction.

The novel was nominated for a 1974 Nebula Award. Previously, the novella "334" won a Locus Poll Award in 1973.

Other
Shrimp watches 54 movies at home. Besides existing films, Disch lists some proposed future works including Leaves of Grass, Melmoth, Stanford White, The Confessions of St. Augustine, Pale Fire, The Three Christs of Ypsilanti, and The Hills of Switzerland; the last is the title of one of Louis Sacchetti's books in Camp Concentration.

Several usages of future slang in early editions of the novel were "corrected" to standard spellings in the 1999 Vintage Books edition. Two of these, "mickeymouse" and "sexlife", were contractions indicating the increasingly casual usage of the phrases; another, "gorillas" for members of the Marines, was changed to "guerrillas", but may have been an intentional pun due to the black masks worn by the soldiers. The novel is dedicated to "Jerry Mundis, who lived here".

Release details
 Original publication of novellas:
 "The Death of Socrates": as "Problems of Creativeness", in The Magazine of Fantasy & Science Fiction, April 1967
 "Bodies": in Quark/ #4, 1971
 "Everyday Life in the Later Roman Empire": in Bad Moon Rising, 1973.
 "Emancipation": in New Dimensions #1, 1971
 "Angouleme": in New Worlds, 1971
 "334": in New Worlds, 1972
 1972, UK, MacGibbon & Kee, hardcover
 1974, US, Avon Books, paperback
 1974, UK, Sphere, paperback
 1976, US, Gregg Press, hardcover
 1981, Australia, Magnum, paperback
 1987, US, Carroll & Graf, paperback
 1999, US, Vintage Books/Random House, trade paperback

References

Works cited

External links
 
 334 annotations at Nitbar

1972 American novels
1972 science fiction novels
American science fiction novels
Dystopian novels
Fiction set in 2025
Novels by Thomas M. Disch
Novels set in Manhattan
Overpopulation fiction
MacGibbon & Kee books